Tamás Herczeg (born on Medgyesegyháza, Hungary on 16 November 1960) is a Hungarian politician and teacher at the College of Folk Culture. He is a member of National Assembly of Hungary (Országgyűlés) since 8 May 2018. He is a member of the Fidesz.

References 

Living people
1960 births
People from Békés County
Hungarian politicians
21st-century Hungarian politicians
Fidesz politicians
Members of the National Assembly of Hungary (2018–2022)